Marchal is a French surname. Notable people with the surname include:

André Marchal (1894–1980), French organist and teacher
Arlette Marchal (1902–1984), French film actress
Élie Marchal (1839–1923), Belgian botanist and mycologist
Henri Marchal (1876–1970), French archaeologist
Georges Marchal (1920–1997), French actor
Gilles Marchal (1944–2013), French songwriter and singer
Jules Marchal (1924–2003), Belgian diplomat and historian
Luc Marchal (born 1943), Belgian military officer
Maurice Marchal (another name for Morvan Marchal, below)
Morvan Marchal (1900–1963), Breton-French architect and nationalist
Olivier Marchal (born 1958), French film director
Sylvain Marchal (born 1980), French footballer
Thibault Marchal (born 1986), French footballer

See also
Marchal, Granada, municipality in Granada, Spain.

French-language surnames